S. J. Laverne Whitman (August 17, 1926 – December 11, 2000) was a former American professional football player who played four seasons in the National Football League for the Chicago Cardinals and the Chicago Bears.

External links
 

1926 births
2000 deaths
People from Hollis, Oklahoma
American football safeties
Tulsa Golden Hurricane football players
Chicago Cardinals players
Chicago Bears players
Players of American football from Oklahoma